The Finsbury Health Centre is in Clerkenwell. It was built in 1935–38, designed by Berthold Lubetkin and the Tecton architecture practice. The design shares some of its materials and detailing with similar Lubetkin projects of the period, including the Priory Green, Spa Green and Hallfield Estates.

Partly restored in the mid-1990s, the building is Grade I listed.

Services housed at the centre include the Michael Palin Centre for Stammering and Clerkenwell Medical Practice.

See also 
 Healthcare in London
 Finsbury, this district, not to be confused with Finsbury Park

References

 Allan, John. Lubetkin: Architecture and the Tradition of Progress (RIBA, 1992)
 Allan, John, & von Sternberg, Morley. Berthold Lubetkin (Merrell, 2002)

External links
Islington Council: Finsbury Health Centre
Design Museum page about Berthold Lubetkin
 about Clerkenwell Medical Practice
 website of film documentary exploring impact of Lubetkin's work in Finsbury

Modernist architecture in London
Berthold Lubetkin buildings
Buildings and structures completed in 1938
Grade I listed buildings in the London Borough of Islington
Health in the London Borough of Islington